Kurkli is a rural locality (a selo) and the administrative centre of Kurklinksy Selsoviet, Laksky District, Republic of Dagestan, Russia. The population was 419 as of 2010. There are 6 streets.

Geography 
Kurkli is located 28 km south of Kumukh (the district's administrative centre) by road. Kuli and Sumbatl are the nearest rural localities.

Nationalities 
Laks live there.

Famous residents 
 Chukundalav (poet)
 Shchaza iz Kurkli (poet)

References 

Rural localities in Laksky District